School of International Studies may refer to one of several institutions:

 University of the Pacific (United States)#School of International Studies, USA
 School of International Studies of the Dresden University of Technology, Germany
 S. Rajaratnam School of International Studies, Singapore
 Paul H. Nitze School of Advanced International Studies, part of Johns Hopkins University
 The Johns Hopkins University SAIS Europe, located in Bologna, Italy
 Hopkins–Nanjing Center
 Josef Korbel School of International Studies, University of Denver, USA
 School of International Studies, University of San Francisco, USA
 School of International Studies, Universidad Santa María (Caracas), Venezuela
 School of International Studies, Simon Fraser University, Canada
 School of International Studies, Central University of Venezuela

See also:
List of international relations schools